Royal Naval Air Station Eglinton or RNAS Eglinton was a Royal Naval Air Station located  north east of Eglinton, County Londonderry, Northern Ireland. It opened as a Royal Air Force Station (RAF Eglinton) in 1941, before being transferred to the Fleet Air Arm in May 1943.

The airfield was operational between 1941 and 1966.

History

RAF Eglinton use

The Royal Naval Air Station has its origins in the early Second World War when in 1941 RAF Eglinton was established as the home to No. 133 Squadron RAF which flew Hawker Hurricane fighters in defence of Londonderry.  In 1942 the airfield was occupied by No. 41 Squadron RAF when it moved in on 22 September flying the Supermarine Spitfire VB before moving to RAF Llanbedr on 20 September 1942.  The station was allocated to the Royal Navy and was transferred in 1943 the airfield became a Fleet Air Arm airfield called RNAS Eglinton (HMS Gannet) and was home to the 1847 Naval Air Squadron which provided convoy air cover as part of the Battle of the Atlantic.

RNAS Eglinton use

RNAS Eglinton was the name assigned to RNAS Eglinton, a Fleet Air Arm airfield in Northern Ireland.  A number of ships have borne the name .

The air station's main function was to work up fighter squadrons' pilots  before joining the attacks on Japan. RNAS Maydown (HMS Shrike) with Fairey Swordfish aircraft next door to Eglinton received Battle Honours for its role in the Battle of the Atlantic from 1943 until 1945. 

April 1959 saw RNAS Eglinton close and the squadrons moved to RAF Ballyhalbert and RAF Ballykelly. In 1989 the married quarter estate comprising 78 houses located in Fraser Avenue and Mill Path in the nearby village of Eglinton were sold to a Roger Byron-Collins company who also acquired the officers married quarters in nearby RAF Ballykelly in 2009.

Posted units
A number of units were here at some point:

A number of RAF squadrons were here at some point:

A number of units were here at some point:

Current use

The current RNAS Eglinton site is now used by the City of Derry Airport in County Londonderry with HMS Gannet a Fleet Air Arm base established in 1971 at RNAS Prestwick in Ayrshire.

See also
List of air stations of the Royal Navy
List of former Royal Air Force stations

References

Citations

Bibliography

Royal Naval Air Stations in Northern Ireland